is a Japanese Mecha anime series produced by Tatsunoko Productions and aired in 1976. There were 36 episodes. It is the second installment to Takara's Magne-Robo Franchise.

Outline
Gowappa was the first super robot anime to feature a female as the leader and main character. The concept of a group of young adults gathering to fight evil can be seen in other Tatsunoko works such as Science Ninja Team Gatchaman and in manga written by Tatsuo Yoshida and Ippei Kuri, but as of 2008, the only other Tatsunoko production featuring a female lead is Time Bokan 2000: Kaitou Kiramekiman. Gowappa 5 Gordam has a bright theme song and light-hearted situations, but the story also includes more serious parts, and there are episodes that end on a rather bitter note.

Because Gowappa 5 Gordam was competing with another robot anime, UFO Robo Grendizer (on Fuji Television), as well as a popular television game show called Up Down Quiz (on Mainichi Broadcasting System), both in the same timeslot, it faced an extremely difficult ratings battle, and was later moved mid-broadcast from Sunday's "Golden Hour" to a weekday evening timeslot, where its ratings suffered. After moving, Tatsunoko attempted to broaden the scope of the series by making Gordam itself into a combining robot, but this did not bring viewers back, so it ended after three seasons (36 episodes). Before and since this series, there have been many Tatsunoko-made series broadcast on the same channels that had to fight for ratings in the same manner.

"Gowappa", the name of the group of five main characters, is an abbreviation created from two of the kanji in the phrase "five children" (五人の小童, gonin no kowappa) to create 五童 (gowappa). However, one of the candidates for the series' name was "Abaranger", and many media outlets actually used this name before the series aired. The Abaranger name would go on to be a candidate name for the later series Golden Warrior Gold Lightan, and would finally be used for the 2003 Super Sentai series Bakuryu Sentai Abaranger.

There is a mistake in the opening animation sequence where Gordam fires its missiles and its other weapon, the Bocunder, hits the enemies instead; Gordam then fires the Bocunder and the missiles explode.

Story
Five youths from Edo City explore a strange rocky island and discover the mecha that Doctor Hoarai had been creating in order to resist the impending attack by a race of subterranean rock people. Doctor Hoarai was ridiculed by the scientific community for his predictions that such an attack would take place. The youths decide to join the doctor (who was dead but had transferred his mind into a computer) in piloting the vehicles and protecting Earth. The Gowapper 5 Godam team is born! With the aid of the giant fighting robot Godam, the Gowapper team under the leadership of Yoko Misaki must face the hordes of the inhuman subterranean people.

Staff
 Planning: Jinzo Toriumi, Akiyoshi Sakai
 Original Work: Tatsuo Yoshida, Tatsunoko  Productions Planning Room
 Magazine Serialization: Tanoshii Youchien, Otomodachi, Bouken'oh
 Director: Hisayuki Toriumi
 Character Design: Yoshitaka Amano
 Mechanical Design: Kunio Okawara
 Art Direction: Mitsuyoshi Kozugi, Tsuneo Nonomiya
 Recording Director: Kan Mizumoto
 Editing: Hajime Taniguchi, Tomoko Kita, Yoko Nidome
 Music: Bob Sakuma
 Producers: Masatsuku Nagai, Takehiko Goto
 Production Collaboration: Sunrise
 Production: Tatsunoko Pro, ABC TV(first part), Japan Educational TV(NET TV, now TV Asahi)(latter part)

Characters

Media

Music
 Opening theme song: "Ikuzo! Gordam" (行くぞ! ゴーダム)
 Sung by: Ichiro Mizuki, Young Fresh
 Composition: Asei Kobayashi
 Lyrics: Ichiro Wakabayashi
 Arrangement: Nozomi Aoki
 Ending theme song: "Song of Gowapper 5" (ゴワッパー5の歌)
 Sung by: Ichiro Mizuki, Young Fresh
 Composition: Asei Kobayashi
 Lyrics: Ichiro Wakabayashi
 Arrangement: Nozomi Aoki

Laserdisc
In 1995, the entire series was released as a Laserdisc box set.

DVD
Nippon Columbia released the DVD boxset in 2005.

Merchandise
The Gowappa 5 Gordam characters and mecha were released in Takara's Magnemo toy line in Japan in 1976. From its first incarnation, Gordam could both combine and transform, like in the show.

The Magnemo line encompasses was Takara Tomy calls the "Magnerobo" series. Included in this series are Steel Jeeg, Magne Robo Gakeen, Chojin Sentai Barattack, and Machine Zaurer.

References
 Much of the content of this article comes from the equivalent Japanese-language Wikipedia article. Retrieved on September 22, 2011.

External links
 

1976 anime television series debuts
Adventure anime and manga
Super robot anime and manga
Tatsunoko Production
Sunrise (company)
TV Asahi original programming